Carl Dahlén (1770 – 1 December 1851) was a Swedish ballet dancer and choreographer, active first at the Royal Swedish Ballet at the Royal Swedish Opera in Stockholm, and second at the Royal Danish Ballet in Copenhagen at the Royal Danish Theatre in Denmark. He belonged to the first male Swedish stars at the Royal Swedish ballet.

Career
He was made a figurante in the ballet 1785, a coryfee in 1789 and premier dancer in 1791. He participated in the pantomime ballet Det dubbla giftermålet by Jean-Rémy Marcadet opposite Margaretha Christina Hallongren, Hedda Hjortsberg, Joseph Saint-Fauraux Raimond and Carlo Caspare Simone Uttini the 1790–91 season. He was admired for his beauty and grace and attracted the attention of King Gustav III of Sweden.

The circumstances of his departure from the Swedish ballet are well known. A nobleman from the royal court was sent to him with the message from the king that he had been given a higher allowance; upon delivering the message, the courtier "allowed himself" a certain remark in connection to this, which insulted Dahlen, who gave him a slap to the face. Dahlen then quickly left the capital in fear of the nobleman's revenge.

He was active at the ballet in Copenhagen for the rest of his career. He also composed his own ballet, Armida, which was performed in 1821–22. He retired in 1823.

Personal life
He married the Danish singer Johanna Elisabeth Morthorst who were active at the theatre in Copenhagen in 1784–1827. They were married in 1802. Dahlén constructed the still existing building at Brolæggerstræde 12 but the couple would only live there until 1800. Their next home was around the corner at Nytorv 11.

Dahlén accepted a young Hans Christian Andersen as a ballet student in spite of his lack of talent. Andersen was also a frequent guest in Dahlén's home, then at Badstuestræde 18: He describes the relationship in The Fairy Tale of My Life:

References 
 Kungliga teaterns repertoar 1773-1973 (The repertoire of the Royal Theatre 1773-1973) 
 Nils Bohman: Svenska män och kvinnor. Bok 2 (Swedish men and women. Dictionary. Book 2) 
 Arvid Ahnfelt: Europas konstnärer (The artists of Europe) (1887)

External links

1770 births
1851 deaths
18th-century Swedish ballet dancers
Swedish male ballet dancers
Swedish choreographers
Gustavian era people
19th-century Swedish ballet dancers
19th-century Danish ballet dancers
Royal Swedish Ballet dancers
Swedish emigrants to Denmark